Love For Money; Or, The Boarding School is a 1691 comedy play by the English writer Thomas D'Urfey. It was originally staged at the Theatre Royal, Drury Lane by the United Company. In 1733 it was adapted into a ballad opera The Boarding School by Charles Coffey.

Original cast

  Cave Underhill as Sir Rowland Rakehell
 William Mountfort as Jack Amorous 
 John Hodgson as Will Merriton
  John Freeman as Old Merriton 
 George Powell as Nedd Bragg alias Captain Bouncer 
 George Bright as  Old Zachary Bragg
 Thomas Doggett as Deputy Nincompoop
 William Bowen as  Monsieur Le Prate
 Mr. Kirkham as Singing Master
 John Bowman as Dancing Master
 Mr. Peire as Presbyterian Parson
 Anthony Leigh as  Lady Addleplot
 Mrs. Richardson as Lady Straddle
 Anne Bracegirdle as Mirtilla
 Frances Maria Knight as Miss Jenny
 Mrs. Davies as Miss Molly
 Charlotte Butler as Betty Jiltall
 Katherine Corey as Crowstich
 Margaret Osborne as Teareshift
 Elinor Leigh as Oyley

References

Bibliography
 Van Lennep, W. The London Stage, 1660-1800: Volume One, 1660-1700. Southern Illinois University Press, 1960.

1691 plays
West End plays
Plays by Thomas d'Urfey
Restoration comedy